Skyborg can mean:

 Skyborg: Into the Vortex, a video game
 Skyborg (USAF program), a project to develop autonomous military aircraft